Tianjin cuisine (Tientsin cuisine), also known as Jin cuisine, refers to the native cooking styles of Tianjin, the largest port city in Northern China. Though heavily influenced by Beijing cuisine, Tianjin cuisine differs by being more focused on seafood. It is categorized by its freshness, saltiness and soft and crispy textures. Cooking methods include grilling, simmering, sautéing and steaming. With more than 300 years of history, the development of the Tianjin cuisine was highly dependent on the diet of boatmen and the salt trades due to its geographical location. Tianjin Food Street is a place where cross-cultural Chinese dishes may be found. Popular dishes include Eight Great Bowls, Four Great Stews, Tianjing goubuli, and Four Winter Delicacies, among others. Eight Great Bowls is a combination of eight different meat dishes. The Four Great Stews refers to a very large number of stews, including chicken, duck, seafood, beef, and mutton. Tianjin also has several famous snack items. Goubuli (狗不理包子) is a classic steamed stuffed bun (baozi) that is well-known throughout China. Guifaxiang (桂发祥麻花) is a traditional brand of mahua (twisted dough sticks).

Development 
Tianjin cuisine was officially formed in 1662, when the first of eight most famous restaurants in Tianjin, Ju Qing Xing, was opened to congratulate the enthronement of Kangxi Emperor. In 1860, Tianjin became a treaty port and allowed the influx of foreign investment. Western cuisine has since then been introduced to the Tianjin cuisine. The most typical example is Kiessling's, the first foreign restaurant in Tianjin, founded by German Albert Kiessling.

Today, the Tianjin diet is mainly categorized into Hanmin (Han Chinese) cuisine, Islamic cuisine, Tianjin vegetarian cuisine and local snacks.

Differences between Tianjin and Beijing cuisines
One of the most distinctive traits involves Tianjin's higher use of seafood, particularly river fish and shrimp. This is primarily attributed to Tianjin's proximity to the sea. Although Beijing and Tianjin cuisines are both salty in the first taste, the latter contains the additional use of sugar, which results in a distinctive flavor. Those new to the Tianjin cuisine will immediately identify a slightly sweet taste embedded in the savory flavor.

Tianjin cuisine also uses more mutton and less pork in comparison to Beijing cuisine, and in the event of traditional holidays, mutton is a must for holiday dishes. In addition, the vegetables and meat are served separately from the noodles in Tianjin cuisines yet in Beijing, they are served together with the noodles.

Finally, Tianjin cuisines are partially influenced by neighbouring countries such as Russia and Japan. Scholars attribute this to the city's location as a treaty port, making its culture and, by extension, its cuisine more complex than other major Chinese cities such as Beijing.

Nanshi Cuisine Street
Nanshi Cuisine Street (南市食品街) holds more than 100 restaurants covering about 40,000 square metres in the area in Tianjin's Heping District. Notable establishments include Zheijiang Restaurant, Da Jin Haiwei, which specializes in seafood, and Erdouyan Fried Cake Shop, a century-old institution known for its rice-powder cakes that are fried in sesame oil.

Notable dishes in Tianjin cuisine

See also
 List of Chinese dishes

References